Dubrovino is a rural locality (a selo) and the administrative center of Dubrovinsky Selsoviet, Romanovsky District, Altai Krai, Russia. The population was 479 as of 2013. There are 5 streets.

Geography 
Dubrovino is located 40 km northwest of Romanovo (the district's administrative centre) by road. Tambovsky is the nearest rural locality.

References 

Rural localities in Romanovsky District, Altai Krai